19th ADG Awards
January 31, 2015

Period Film:
The Grand Budapest Hotel

Fantasy Film:
Guardians of the Galaxy

Contemporary Film:
Birdman

The 19th Art Directors Guild Awards, which were given on January 31, 2015, honored the best production designers of 2014.

Winners and nominees

Film
 Period Film:
 Adam Stockhausen – The Grand Budapest Hotel
 Maria Djurkovic – The Imitation Game
 David Crank – Inherent Vice
 John-Paul Kelly – The Theory of Everything
 Jon Hutman – Unbroken

 Fantasy Film:
 Charles Wood – Guardians of the Galaxy
 Peter Wenham – Captain America: The Winter Soldier
 James Chinlund – Dawn of the Planet of the Apes
 Nathan Crowley – Interstellar
 Dennis Gassner – Into the Woods

 Contemporary Film:
 Kevin Thompson – Birdman
 James J. Murakami and Charisse Cardenas – American Sniper
 Jess Gonchor – Foxcatcher
 Donald Graham Burt – Gone Girl
 Kevin Kavanaugh – Nightcrawler

Television
 One-Hour Period or Fantasy Single-Camera Television Series
 Deborah Riley – Game of Thrones (for "The Laws of Gods and Men")
 Bill Groom – Boardwalk Empire (for "Golden Days for Boys and Girls")
 Doug Kraner – Gotham (for "Pilot")
 Howard Cummings – The Knick (for "Method and Madness" and "Working Late a Lot")
 Dan Bishop – Mad Men (for "Time Zones")

 One-Hour Contemporary Single-Camera Television Series
 Alex DiGerlando – True Detective (for "The Locked Room" and "Form and Void")
 John D. Kretschmer – Homeland (for "The Drone Queen")
 Steve Arnold – House of Cards (for "Chapter 18")
 Dave Blass – Justified (for "A Murder of Crowes", "Wrong Roads", and "The Toll")
 Karen Steward – The Newsroom (for "Boston", "Main Justice", and "Contempt")

Episode of a Half Hour Single-Camera Television Series
 Richard Toyon – Silicon Valley (for "Articles of Incorporation", "Signaling Risk", and "Optimal Tip-To-Tip Efficiency")
 Ray Yamagata – Californication (for "Faith, Hope, Love", "Like Father Like Son", and "Kickoff")
 Ray Yamagata – House of Lies (for "Wreckage", "Middlegame", and "Zha- Moreng")
 Claire Bennett – Modern Family (for "Marco Polo", "Won't You Be Our Neighbor", and "Halloween 3: AwesomeLand")
 James Gloster – Veep (for "Clovis", "Special Relationship", and "Debate")

 Multi-Camera Series
 John Shaffner – The Big Bang Theory (for "The Convention Conundrum", "The Locomotive Manipulation", and "The Status Quo Combustion")
 Stephan Olson – How I Met Your Mother (for "How Your Mother Met Me")
 John Shaffner – Mike & Molly (for "Mike & Molly's Excellent Adventure" and "The Dice Lady Cometh")
 Glenda Rovello – The Millers (for "You Are the Wind Beneath My Wings, Man", "Con-Troversy", and "Papa Was a Rolling Bone")
 Cabot McMullen – Undateable (for "Pilot")

 Miniseries or Television Movie:
 Mark Worthington – American Horror Story: Freak Show (for "Massacres and Matinees")
 Seth Reed – Cosmos: A Spacetime Odyssey (for "Unafraid of the Dark")
 John Blackie and Warren Alan Young – Fargo
 Patrizia Von Brandenstein – Houdini
 Arwel W. Jones – Sherlock: His Last Vow

External links
 The winners and nominees on the official website

2014 film awards
2014 guild awards
Art Directors Guild Awards
2015 in American cinema